The 2017 Rugby Europe Sevens Grand Prix served as a European qualifier not only for the 2018 Hong Kong Sevens qualifier tournament, but for two bids among the teams not already qualified for the 2018 Rugby World Cup Sevens.

Schedule

Standings

The 2017 Grand Prix Series serves as a qualifying event for two other tournaments:
 The three highest ranked European teams (other than the five teams below marked with a "C" that are not already core teams in the Sevens World Series) will qualify to the 2018 Hong Kong Sevens, with a chance to qualify for the 2018–19 World Rugby Sevens Series. 
 The top two teams (other than the three teams marked with a "Q" that already qualified) will qualify for the 2018 Rugby World Cup Sevens.

Poland cannot be relegated due to being a host nation.

Moscow

Łódź

Clermont-Ferrand

Exeter

See also
 2017 Rugby Europe Women's Sevens Championships
 2018 Rugby World Cup Sevens qualifying – Men

References

Grand Prix
2017
2017 rugby sevens competitions
2017 in European sport